Michał Florian Rzewuski (died 1687) was a Polish-Lithuanian nobleman and politician, Treasurer of the Crown Court. 
He moved to Lviv in 1663 and worked there as a writer (1670–1676) and royal colonel from 1674. He was Treasurer of the Crown Court from 1684, he was also Starosta of Chełm. A brave knight, he participated in almost all the battles of John II Casimir, contributed to the victory of Chocim, further distinguishing himself in the Turkish wars for Jan III Sobieski.

Children
 Stanisław Mateusz Rzewuski (1662–1728), Field and Great Crown Hetman 
 Eleonora Anna Rzewuska (born c.1685), wife of Count Karol Aleksander Krasicki h. Rogala (c.1650–1717)

References

17th-century Polish politicians
Ruthenian nobility of the Polish–Lithuanian Commonwealth
1687 deaths
17th-century Polish military personnel
Year of birth unknown
Michal Florian